The 2020 Galician regional election was on Sunday, 12 July 2020, to elect the 11th Parliament of the autonomous community of Galicia. All 75 seats in the Parliament were up for election. The election was initially scheduled for 5 April 2020 but was postponed as a result of the COVID-19 pandemic. It was held simultaneously with a regional election in the Basque Country.

In early February 2020, concerns about a possible snap election in the Basque Country to be called for 5 April raised speculation on whether regional president Alberto Núñez Feijóo would be willing to advance the Galician regional election to be held concurrently with the Basque one, as had happened in 2009, 2012 and 2016, despite Feijóo's earlier claims that his will was against bringing about a premature end to the legislature. On 10 February, Lehendakari Iñigo Urkullu's confirmation of a Basque election for 5 April prompted Feijóo to precipitate the end of the Galician legislature and announce a regional election for the same day. However, on 16 March it was announced that the vote would be postponed for the duration of the COVID-19 pandemic in Spain, shortly after Prime Minister Pedro Sánchez's declaration of a nationwide lockdown in the country starting on the previous day.

Feijóo's ruling People's Party (PP) maintained its dominance at the regional level, maintaining its vote share and seat count from the 2016 election. The Galician Nationalist Bloc (BNG) picked up the vast majority of losses from Galicia in Common–Renewal–Tides (GeC–AM), the successor alliance to En Marea after several party splits, seeing their results spike by over 15% to second place of the vote and seeing their seat count increase by 13 to their best result since 1997. The Socialists' Party of Galicia (PSdeG–PSOE) remained in third place, neither gaining nor losing any seats compared to the previous election. Support for GeC–AM plummeted in comparison to En Marea's results in 2016, failing to cross the electoral threshold and losing all 14 of the seats they held prior to the vote. The far-right Vox, which had seen a rise in support in the region during the November 2019 general election, failed to cross the electoral threshold and suffered from tactical voting to Feijóo's PP.

Overview

Electoral system
The Parliament of Galicia was the devolved, unicameral legislature of the autonomous community of Galicia, having legislative power in regional matters as defined by the Spanish Constitution of 1978 and the regional Statute of Autonomy, as well as the ability to vote confidence in or withdraw it from a regional president.

Voting for the Parliament was on the basis of universal suffrage, which comprised all nationals over 18 years of age, registered in Galicia and in full enjoyment of their political rights. Additionally, Galicians abroad were required to apply for voting before being permitted to vote, a system known as "begged" or expat vote. The 75 members of the Parliament of Galicia were elected using the D'Hondt method and a closed list proportional representation, with an electoral threshold of five percent of valid votes—which included blank ballots—being applied in each constituency. Seats were allocated to constituencies, corresponding to the provinces of A Coruña, Lugo, Ourense and Pontevedra, with each being allocated an initial minimum of 10 seats and the remaining 35 being distributed in proportion to their populations.

The use of the D'Hondt method might result in a higher effective threshold, depending on the district magnitude.

Election date
The term of the Parliament of Galicia expired four years after the date of its previous election, unless it was dissolved earlier. The election decree was required to be issued no later than the twenty-fifth day prior to the date of expiry of parliament and published on the following day in the Official Journal of Galicia (DOG), with election day taking place between the fifty-fourth and the sixtieth day from publication. The previous election was held on 25 September 2016, which meant that the legislature's term would have expired on 25 September 2020. The election decree was required to be published in the DOG no later than 1 September 2020, with the election taking place up to the sixtieth day from publication, setting the latest possible election date for the Parliament on Saturday, 30 October 2020.

The president had the prerogative to dissolve the Parliament and call a snap election, provided that it did not occur before one year had elapsed since a previous dissolution under this procedure. In the event of an investiture process failing to elect a regional president within a two-month period from the first ballot, the Parliament was to be automatically dissolved and a fresh election called.

The decision of Catalan president Quim Torra on 29 January 2020 to announce a snap Catalan regional election to be held at some point throughout 2020 was said to have raised concerns within the Basque government of Lehendakari Iñigo Urkullu, whose party, the Basque Nationalist Party (PNV), sought to prevent the next Basque regional election—which was due by autumn of 2020 at the latest—from being held simultaneously to prevent any interference from the Catalan political debate into the Basque campaign. This in turn increased pressure on Galician president Alberto Núñez Feijóo to unveil the Galician election date, with speculation mounting on whether he would coordinate the electoral timing with that of a hypothetical snap Basque election—as had happened in 2009, 2012 and 2016—or would let the legislature reach its natural end, thus bringing the election to the autumn of 2020.

Asked on the issue on 7 February, Feijóo did not rule out a simultaneous call with the Basque election, but vindicated that the autonomy of adopting such a decision was "his" and that he would not be discussing hypothetical scenarios—on the possibility of Urkullu announcing a snap election within the next few days—until they happened. La Vanguardia reported on 9 February that Feijóo could be interested in waiting for an autumn election to be held concurrently with the Catalan one, at a time when he had not yet revealed whether he would be running for a fourth time in office. On 10 February, Urkullu confirmed the Basque election for 5 April, with Feijóo commenting that he would be making a choice on the date of the Galician election "immediately" but that it would not be affected by Urkullu's decision. In response to the Basque announcement, Feijóo summoned his government to an urgency meeting later in the same day and decided to trigger a snap election to be held simultaneously on 5 April.

As a result of the COVID-19 pandemic, the election's original date was suspended on 16 March, with it being rescheduled for 12 July 2020 on 18 May after the easing of virus spreading conditions and a reduction in the infection rate, resulting in the lockdown established by the state of alarm lasting from 15 March to 21 June.

Background
A vote of no confidence in June 2018 had seen the downfall of Prime Minister Mariano Rajoy, of Galician descent, and his succession by Pedro Sánchez from the Spanish Socialist Workers' Party (PSOE). After eight convoluted months in which the PSOE had led a very precarious minority government, Sánchez called a general election for 28 April 2019, in which the People's Party (PP) did not come out in top place in Galicia for the first time in history, with the party having won all previous elections—general, local, European and regional—since its inception in 1989. The local and European Parliament elections held on 26 May 2019 saw the PSOE's local branch, the Socialists' Party of Galicia (PSdeG), sweeping across the region and winning control of all main Galician cities but Pontevedra and Ourense: A Coruña, Ferrol, Lugo, Santiago de Compostela and Vigo, the latter seeing an humiliating defeat for Galician president Alberto Núñez Feijóo after his local candidate scored a bare 13% of the vote to the PSdeG of incumbent mayor Abel Caballero's 67%. The electoral victories of 2019 and the weaknesses of the ruling PP after eleven years in the Xunta de Galicia prompted prospects of the PSdeG being returned to the regional government under the leadership of Gonzalo Caballero, nephew of Vigo's mayor.

Concurrently, the political space held by the En Marea party had broke up after internal disputes. In late 2018, a crisis concerning the election of a new party leadership resulted in a split between members supporting Luis Villares and En Marea's founding member parties, Podemos, Renewal–Nationalist Brotherhood (Anova) and United Left (EU). Villares was elected as new En Marea leader on 24 December 2018 amid accusations of fraud and vote rigging, prompting Podemos, Anova and EU to withdraw from En Marea, dubbing it as a "failed" political project. Podemos and EU would contest both the April and the November 2019 general elections under the En Común–Unidas Podemos brand, forming the Galicia en Común sub-group within Unidas Podemos in the Congress of Deputies. In September 2019, legislators from Podemos, Anova and EU formed the Grupo Común da Esquerda in the Parliament of Galicia, forcing En Marea loyalists into the Mixed Group.

Parliamentary composition
The Parliament of Galicia was officially dissolved on 11 February 2020, after the publication of the dissolution decree in the Official Journal of Galicia. The table below shows the composition of the parliamentary groups in the chamber at the time of dissolution.

Parties and candidates
The electoral law allowed for parties and federations registered in the interior ministry, coalitions and groupings of electors to present lists of candidates. Parties and federations intending to form a coalition ahead of an election were required to inform the relevant Electoral Commission within ten days of the election call, whereas groupings of electors needed to secure the signature of at least one percent of the electorate in the constituencies for which they sought election, disallowing electors from signing for more than one list of candidates.

Below is a list of the main parties and electoral alliances which contested the election:

On 11 February Gonzalo Pérez Jácome, leader of the Ourensan Democracy (DO) party—which secured 4.4% of the vote in the Ourense province in the 2016 election—and mayor of Ourense with PP support, announced that he would be voting for Feijóo amid speculation that DO would be joining PP's electoral lists ahead of the regional election. An electoral alliance with Citizens was proposed by Cs spokesperson Inés Arrimadas but was rejected by Feijóo.

En Marea leader Luis Villares announced on 19 February his farewell from politics and his return to his judge post, casting doubt about En Marea's fate in the election ahead and whether the party would end up running in the election or withdrawing from the electoral contest. After the election was suspended and rescheduled for 12 July, the party announced that it would be contesting within the Marea Galeguista alliance together with Commitment to Galicia (CxG) and the Galicianist Party (PG).

Timetable
The key dates are listed below (all times are CET):

10 February: The election decree is issued with the countersign of the President after deliberation in the Council of Government.
11 February: Formal dissolution of the Parliament of Galicia and beginning of a suspension period of events for the inauguration of public works, services or projects.
14 February: Initial constitution of provincial and zone electoral commissions.
21 February: Deadline for parties and federations intending to enter into a coalition to inform the relevant electoral commission.
2 March: Deadline for parties, federations, coalitions, and groupings of electors to present lists of candidates to the relevant electoral commission.
4 March: Submitted lists of candidates are provisionally published in the Official Journal of Galicia (DOG).
7 March: Deadline for citizens entered in the Register of Absent Electors Residing Abroad (CERA) and for citizens temporarily absent from Spain to apply for voting.
8 March: Deadline for parties, federations, coalitions, and groupings of electors to rectify irregularities in their lists.
9 March: Official proclamation of valid submitted lists of candidates.
10 March: Proclaimed lists are published in the DOG.
16 March: Feijóo announces the elections will be postponed due to the COVID-19 pandemic.

19 May: The election decree is newly issued with the countersign of the President after deliberation in the Council of Government.
20 May: Beginning of a suspension period of events for the inauguration of public works, services or projects.
25 May: Initial constitution of historical territory and zone electoral commissions.
29 May: Deadline for parties and federations intending to enter into a coalition to inform the relevant electoral commission.
8 June: Deadline for parties, federations, coalitions, and groupings of electors to present lists of candidates to the relevant electoral commission.
10 June: Submitted lists of candidates are provisionally published in the DOG.
13 June: Deadline for citizens entered in the CERA and for citizens temporarily absent from Spain to apply for voting.
14 June: Deadline for parties, federations, coalitions, and groupings of electors to rectify irregularities in their lists.
15 June: Official proclamation of valid submitted lists of candidates.
16 June: Proclaimed lists are published in the DOG.
26 June: Official start of electoral campaigning.
2 July: Deadline to apply for postal voting.
7 July: Official start of legal ban on electoral opinion polling publication, dissemination or reproduction and deadline for CERA citizens to vote by mail.
8 July: Deadline for postal and temporarily absent voters to issue their votes.
10 July: Last day of official electoral campaigning and deadline for CERA citizens to vote in a ballot box in the relevant consular office or division.
11 July: Official 24-hour ban on political campaigning prior to the general election (reflection day).
12 July: Polling day (polling stations open at 9 am and close at 8 pm or once voters present in a queue at/outside the polling station at 8 pm have cast their vote). Provisional counting of votes starts immediately.
20 July: General counting of votes, including the counting of CERA votes.
23 July: Deadline for the general counting of votes to be carried out by the relevant electoral commission.
1 August: Deadline for elected members to be proclaimed by the relevant electoral commission.
11 August: Deadline for the parliament to be re-assembled (the election decree determines this date).
10 September: Final deadline for definitive results to be published in the DOG.

Campaign

Party slogans

Election debates

Opinion polls
The tables below list opinion polling results in reverse chronological order, showing the most recent first and using the dates when the survey fieldwork was done, as opposed to the date of publication. Where the fieldwork dates are unknown, the date of publication is given instead. The highest percentage figure in each polling survey is displayed with its background shaded in the leading party's colour. If a tie ensues, this is applied to the figures with the highest percentages. The "Lead" column on the right shows the percentage-point difference between the parties with the highest percentages in a poll.

Graphical summary

Voting intention estimates
The table below lists weighted voting intention estimates. Refusals are generally excluded from the party vote percentages, while question wording and the treatment of "don't know" responses and those not intending to vote may vary between polling organisations. When available, seat projections determined by the polling organisations are displayed below (or in place of) the percentages in a smaller font; 38 seats were required for an absolute majority in the Parliament of Galicia.

Voter turnout
The table below shows registered vote turnout on election day without including voters from the Census of Absent-Residents (CERA).

Results

Overall

Distribution by constituency

Aftermath

Under Article 15 of the Statute, investiture processes to elect the president of the Regional Government of Galicia required of an absolute majority—more than half the votes cast—to be obtained in the first ballot. If unsuccessful, a new ballot would be held 24 hours later requiring only of a simple majority—more affirmative than negative votes—to succeed. If the proposed candidate was not elected, successive proposals were to be transacted under the same procedure.

2022 investiture

Notes

References
Opinion poll sources

Other

2020 in Galicia (Spain)
Galicia
Galicia
July 2020 events in Spain
Regional elections in Galicia (Spain)